Otoba novogranatensis is a species of tree distributed from S. Nicaragua to Ecuador found in lowland to submontane forests up to 1300 m asl. It can reach heights of up to 30 m tall with a bole of 45 cm in diameter and has low buttresses.

References 

Myristicaceae
Trees of Nicaragua
Trees of Costa Rica
Trees of Panama
Trees of Colombia
Trees of Ecuador